Something Out of Nothing may refer to:
 "Something Outa Nothing", a song written by Simon May, Stewart James and Bradley James
 Something Out of Nothing: Marie Curie and Radium, a book by Carla Killough McClafferty
 Something Out of Nothing (film), a 1979 Bulgarian comedy film
 Ex nihilo, a concept chiefly in philosophical or theological contexts